Jonathan Harvey Rowell (February 10, 1833 – May 15, 1908) was a U.S. Representative from Illinois.

Biography
Born in Haverhill, New Hampshire, Rowell attended Rock Creek School and later graduated from Eureka College, Illinois. During the Civil War he served as a company officer in the Seventeenth Regiment, Illinois Volunteer Infantry.

In 1867 his son Chester Harvey Rowell was born. Chester would later become active in politics in California. He studied law. He was admitted to the bar in 1866 and commenced practice in Bloomington, Illinois. He was the state's attorney of the eighth judicial circuit of Illinois 1868-1872.

Rowell was elected as a Republican to the 48th United States Congress and to the three succeeding Congresses (March 4, 1883 – March 3, 1891). He served as chairman of the Committee on Elections (Fifty-first Congress). He was an unsuccessful candidate for reelection in 1890 to the Fifty-second Congress after which he resumed the practice of law.

He died in Bloomington, McLean County, Illinois, May 16, 1908, and was interred in Evergreen Cemetery (Bloomington, Illinois).

References

1833 births
1908 deaths
American people of Welsh descent
Eureka College alumni
People from Bloomington, Illinois
Illinois lawyers
District attorneys in Illinois
People of Illinois in the American Civil War
Union Army officers
Republican Party members of the United States House of Representatives from Illinois
19th-century American politicians